Floored Genius 3 – Julian Cope's Oddicon of Lost Rarities & Versions 1978–98 is a rarities compilation album by Julian Cope, released in 2000 on Cope's own Head Heritage label.

It contains previously unreleased demos, studio and live recordings, as well as a few previously released tracks, such as the two rare singles, "Competition" and "Propheteering". Many of the tracks were recorded during periods when Cope was in between record deals.

Track listing

Notes
Adapted from the album's liner notes, except where noted.
"Ascending" – Three recordings exists of this song. This is the most recent version from 1998, featuring Thighpaulsandra's string and flutes arrangement.  
"Conspiracist Blues" – Recorded live at The Lemon Tree in Aberdeen during Cope's first Highlands & Islands Tour of Scotland, according to the album's liner notes, but is in fact a studio recording.
"Propheteering" – 7" single released in 1997 as a limited edition.
"Mighty Carl Jung" – Recorded soon after Island dropped Cope in November 1992. It was forgotten until 1997, when Cope overdubbed a Mellotron at Thighpaulsandra's studio.
"Highway Blues" – Released in 1995 on The Big Issue South LP. Recorded soon after Island dropped Cope in November 1992.
"Sqwubbsy Versus King Plank" – "A particularly arch protometal version of this weird glam song," according to the album's liner notes. 
"You Can't Hurt Me Anymore" – Written for the E. Man Groovin' session with Hugoth and Tom Nicolson, Tim Bran and Gorby Butterworth. This is a later version recorded in Liverpool. The Mellotron was overdubbed during Thigpaulsandra's 1997 remix.
"Oh Yeah, but Never Like This Before" – Recorded by Cope with the band The Sons Of T.C. Lethbridge.
"The One I Call My Own" – One of three recorded versions and originally attempted as a potential single, then dropped as being too long. The Mellotron was added during Thigpaulsandra's 1997 remix
"Jellypop Perky Jean" – This new version was recorded in 1993, as several A&R men viewed it as a potential single.
"Tighten-Up" – Recorded in two hours for a live mime on Japanese television. The audience was dubbed on later by the TV company.
"Zabriskie Point" – A live recording. The studio version was lost when Cope moved to the West Country in 1992.
"I Need Someone" and "Prince Varmint" – When I.R.S. Records showed interest in Cope, c. 1985, his manager paid for these two songs to be recorded along with several others, some of which are now lost.
"Competition" – 7" single released in 1985 by Cope under the name Rabbi Joseph Gordan and limited to 2000 copies. Produced by Steve Lovell, credited as Bernard Gazda. 
"Satisfaction" – Recorded in June 1978 at Will Sergeant's home studio. It was the result of a collaboration between Sergeant and Paul Simpson's band Industrial Domestic and Cope.

Personnel 
Credits adapted from the album's liner notes.

Musicians
Julian Cope – vocals, guitar, bass, keyboards
Donald Ross Skinner – guitar, keyboards, drums
Terry "Doggen" Dobbin – guitar
Anthony "Moon-Eye" Foster – guitar
Will Sergeant – guitar
Steve "Johnno" Johnson – bass
James Eller – bass
Thighpaulsandra – synthesizer
Mark "Rooster" Cosby – drums
Chris Whitten – drums
Kevin Bales – drums
Mike Joyce – drums
Dorian Cope (credited as "Mavis Grind") – vocals on "Ascending"
Paul Simpson – vocals on "Satisfaction"

Technical 
Julian Cope – producer, art direction, compiled by
Donald Ross Skinner – producer
Steve Lovell – producer 
Thighpaulsandra – recording engineer, remastering
Hugo Nicolson – recording engineer
David Wrench – recording engineer
Paul "Chas" Watkins – recording engineer
Shaun Harvey – recording engineer
Lisa Bennett – art direction
Ed Sirrs – cover photography
Smelly Elly – back photography
Dorian Cope – compiled by
Joanne Wilder – compiled by

References

External links
 Floored Genius 3 on Discogs.com. Retrieved on 13 March 2018.

Julian Cope albums
2000 compilation albums